Johan Ludvig Heiberg may refer to:

 Johan Ludvig Heiberg (poet) (1791–1860), Danish poet and dramatist, husband of Johanne Luise Heiberg
 Johan Ludvig Heiberg (historian) (1854–1928), Danish philologist and historian of mathematics